General Stewart may refer to:

United Kingdom
Alexander Stewart (British Army officer) (c. 1739–1794), British Army major general
Alexander Stewart, Earl of Mar (c. 1375–1435), Scottish general
Andrew Stewart (British Army officer), (born 1952), British Army major general
Sir Donald Stewart, 1st Baronet (1824–1900), British Indian Army general
Herbert Stewart (1843–1885), British Army major general
Ian MacAlister Stewart (1895–1987), British Army brigadier general
James Stewart (British Army general) (c. 1699–1768), Scots Guards lieutenant general
William Stewart (British Army officer, born 1774) (1774–1827), British Army lieutenant general

United States
Alexander P. Stewart (1821–1908), Confederate States Army lieutenant general
David F. Stewart (fl. 1990s–2020s), U.S. Army brigadier general
James T. Stewart (1921–1990), U.S. Air Force lieutenant general
James Stewart (1908–1997), American actor who was also a U.S. Air Force major general
Joseph D. Stewart (1942–2019), U.S. Marine Corps major general
Merch Bradt Stewart (1875–1934), U.S. Army temporary brigadier general
Phillip A. Stewart (fl. 1990s–2020s), U.S. Air Force major general
Robert L. Stewart (born 1942), U.S. Army brigadier general
Walter Stewart (general) (1756–1796), Continental Army brevet brigadier general and militia major general

Others
Bernard Stewart, 4th Lord of Aubigny (c. 1452–1508), French Army lieutenant general
James Stewart (Australian Army officer) (1884–1947), Australian Army brigadier general
John Smith Stewart (1878–1970), Canadian Army brigadier general
John Stewart, Earl of Buchan (c. 1381–1424), Scottish nobleman allied with France in the Hundred Years War
Keith Lindsay Stewart (1896–1972), New Zealand major general
Robert Stewart, 4th Lord of Aubigny (c. 1470–1544), French soldier who ultimately served as Marshal of France
Vincent Stewart (born 1958), New Zealand lieutenant general
William Stewart, 2nd Viscount Mountjoy (1675–1728), Master-General of the Ordnance of Ireland

See also
Arthur Stewart-Cox (1925–2003), British Army major general
John Stewart-Murray, 8th Duke of Atholl (1871–1942), British Army brigadier general
General Steuart (disambiguation)
General Stuart (disambiguation)
Attorney General Stewart (disambiguation)